Ángel Rodado Jareño (born 7 March 1997) is a Spanish professional footballer who plays as a forward for Wisła Kraków.

Club career
Born in Palma de Mallorca, Balearic Islands, Rodado was a RCD Mallorca youth graduate. He made his senior debut with the reserves on 21 February 2016, starting in a 2–0 Tercera División away win against CF Sant Rafel, and featured in a further six matches as his side achieved promotion to Segunda División B in the play-offs.

Rodado scored his first senior goal on 4 September 2016, netting the opener in a 2–1 win at Atlético Levante UD. In the 2017–18 campaign, he scored 30 goals for the B's, which included hat-tricks against CE Santanyí (6–0 home win), CE Mercadal (5–0 home win) and UD Poblense (4–3 home win).

On 16 August 2018, Rodado joined neighbouring UD Ibiza in the third division. He featured regularly for the club, and helped in their first-ever promotion to Segunda División in the 2020–21 season. 

Rodado made his professional debut on 13 August 2021, coming on as a late substitute for Sergio Castel in a 0–0 away draw against Real Zaragoza. Late in the month, he moved to FC Barcelona on a one-year loan deal, and was assigned to the B-team in Primera División RFEF.

On 20 August 2022, Rodado moved abroad for the first time in his career to join Polish I liga side Wisła Kraków on a three-year deal.

References

External links
 
 
 

1997 births
Living people
Footballers from Palma de Mallorca
Spanish footballers
Association football forwards
Segunda División players
Primera Federación players
Segunda División B players
Tercera División players
RCD Mallorca B players
UD Ibiza players
FC Barcelona Atlètic players
Wisła Kraków players
Spanish expatriate footballers
Expatriate footballers in Poland
Spanish expatriate sportspeople in Poland